Anthony Lionel Shelly (2 February 1937 – 4 October 1998) was a racing driver from New Zealand. He scored no World Championship points. He also owned a BMW dealership called Shelly Motors in Honolulu. The business had previously belonged to Shelly's father and had been sold on his death. Shelly subsequently re-acquired the business and became an American citizen in 1975. He divided his time between a home in Honolulu and one in New Zealand, where he died.

Career
Shelly made his motor racing debut in January 1955, entering a Morgan in the Sports Car class for the New Zealand Grand Prix. Shelly qualified but did not start the race. Shelly won "the first big race he contested" at Teretonga in 1958 driving a Cooper and went on to become a leading driver in Australia and New Zealand before moving to race in Europe in 1962. He drove mainly for John Dalton, usually in non-championship events with moderate success, a fifth in the Lombank Trophy and a third in the Lavant Cup being the highlights of his season. He was entered to 1962 Le Mans in June by Colin Chapman to co-drive with Les Leston with a Lotus 23, but the race organizer, ACO, denied the entry in the famous Lotus Le Mans debacle. He also entered three Formula One World championship events, at Aintree, where he retired with a failed cylinder head gasket, and at the Nürburgring and Monza, where he failed to qualify on each occasion. At the end of the season he returned to New Zealand where he continued to race in 1963 and 1964 following which he retired, although he did compete occasionally thereafter.

Complete Formula One World Championship results
(key)

Complete Formula One Non-Championship results
(key) (Races in bold indicate pole position)
(Races in italics indicate fastest lap)

References

New Zealand Formula One drivers
New Zealand racing drivers
Tasman Series drivers
1937 births
1998 deaths